Marco Durante may refer to:

 Marco Durante (golfer) (born 1962), Italian golfer
 Marco Durante (physicist) (born 1965), Italian physicist